Senator Baker may refer to:

Members of the United States Senate
David J. Baker (1792–1869), U.S. Senator from Illinois in 1830
Edward Dickinson Baker (1811–1861), U.S. Senator from Oregon from 1860 to 1861
Howard Baker (1925–2014), U.S. Senator from Tennessee from 1967 to 1985
Lucien Baker (1846–1907), U.S. Senator from Kansas from 1895 to 1901

United States state senate members
B. Frank Baker (1864–1939), Illinois State Senate
Carey Baker (born 1963), Florida State Senate
Charles H. Baker (1847–1919), Massachusetts State Senate
Charles W. Baker (1876–1963), Illinois State Senate
Daniel C. Baker (1816–1863), Massachusetts State Senate
Earl M. Baker (born 1940), Pennsylvania State Senate
George H. Baker (1859–1928), Washington State Senate
Gilbert Baker (politician) (born 1956), Arkansas State Senate
Henry Moore Baker (1841–1912), New Hampshire State Senate
Herbert F. Baker (1862–1930), Michigan State Senate
Horace Baker (1869–1941), New Jersey State Senate
Isaac V. Baker Jr. (1843–1912), New York State Senate
J. Edwin Baker (1899–1963), Florida State Senate
Jesse Matlack Baker (1854–1913), Pennsylvania State Senate
John Baker (1832–1915), Indiana State Senate
John S. Baker (1861–1955), Washington State Senate
LaMar Baker (1915–2003), Tennessee State Senate
Lewis Baker (politician) (1832–1899), West Virginia State Senate
Linda Baker (born 1948), Maine State Senate
Lisa Baker (Pennsylvania politician), Pennsylvania State Senate
Robert Hall Baker (1839–1882), Wisconsin State Senate
Rosalyn Baker (born 1946), Hawaii State Senate
Roy Baker (politician) (born 1945), Nebraska State Senate
Simmons Jones Baker (1775–1853), North Carolina State Senate
Tom Baker (Nebraska politician) (born 1948), Nebraska State Senate
Walter Arnold Baker (1937–2010), Kentucky State Senate
Walter M. Baker (1927–2012), Maryland State Senate
William Benjamin Baker (1840–1911), Maryland State Senate
William R. Baker (1820–1890), Texas State Senate